Frank Hall (born 15 December 1944 in Ottawa) is a Canadian former sailor who competed in the 1972 Summer Olympics.

References

1944 births
Living people
Sportspeople from Ottawa
Canadian male sailors (sport)
Olympic sailors of Canada
Sailors at the 1972 Summer Olympics – Dragon